The northern zigzag salamander (Plethodon dorsalis) is a species of salamander in the family Plethodontidae. It is endemic to the eastern United States and has been found in Illinois, Kentucky, Tennessee, Alabama, and Mississippi. The northern zigzag salamander's natural habitat includes temperate forests, rocky areas, and caves. It is threatened by habitat loss.

References

Plethodon
Amphibians of the United States
Amphibians described in 1889
Taxonomy articles created by Polbot